The 1922 Centenary Gentlemen football team represented the Centenary College of Louisiana during the 1922 college football season. The nine-game schedule was the longest in school history. "A small, obscure liberal arts college with a student body of less than 300 suddenly fields a powerful football team in 1922." The team posted an 8–1 record and was led by head coach Bo McMillin, who preferred to be at a small school.

Schedule

References

Centenary
Centenary Gentlemen football seasons
Centenary Gentlemen football